Egor Kuroptev is a Russian and Georgian political expert and media manager.

Kuroptev currently holds the position of the director of the "Free Russia Foundation" in South Caucasus. He also produces several well-known media projects such as "Пограничная ZONA" ("Border Zone"). From September, 2019 Kuroptev represents distribution of the German Public broadcaster "Deutsche Welle" in South Caucasus.

Career 
Kuroptev started his career in the age of 17 as a head of administration dept at Echo of Moscow news radio in Moscow.

He worked for Echo of Moscow till 2007 when he decided to start his career as a startup projects director. Together with his colleague and friend Matvey Ganapolsky (famous journalist and media manager) Kuroptev launched a new media startup project for Comcor Holding - cable TV Channel VKT AKADO that was successfully produced by their team. Since 2006 Kuroptev worked as a media and PR projects director for several companies and NGO's including AVI-CHAI foundation (Russia), Talents of the World foundation (Caucasus),  Rikor Holding (Russia), Russian-American Foundation (USA),AS Group Investment (Azerbaijan), MTV (Russia), 1st Channel (Russia), Hydepark TV production studio (Russia-Georgia) and other well-known companies of various countries.

He produced several well-known media projects such as Runway Project (Russia), Cosmopolitan.Videoversion (Russia), Main topic TV show (Georgia), Applause project, On the Stadium, etc. During the career Kuroptev launched several entertainment, political, educational and social projects in Russia, Georgia, Azerbaijan and some other countries.

Georgia 
In 2012 Kuroptev was invited to Georgia to launch a new political talk-show "Main topic" hosted by one of the famous leaders of the Russian opposition Ksenia Sobchak for state TV company PIK TV owned by Georgian Public Broadcaster. In 2013 he produced several charity classical and pop-concerts in Georgia and Azerbaijan.

From 2014 to 2018 he had been working as the Projects’ Director for GAA Holding that unites several well-known advertising, media and trading companies.

In the beginning of 2015 Kuroptev launched a new media project Star media group focused on unbiased news and Georgia's western integration. He became the General Producer for Star Media Group – media company that unites several web and broadcasting media sources covering EU association agreement, cooperation between Georgia and NATO so as a local Georgian politics. This media company also produced high level discussions in talk-shows on current situation regarding conflicts between Russia and Georgia so as between Ukraine and Russia. As a general producer of the project Kuroptev focused on human rights protection, cooperating with local NGO's and international organizations representatives.

From 2017 Kuroptev produces and hosts its own popular TV show "Пограничная ZONA" (Border Zone) in Russian language. Presidents of Georgia and Armenia, Under Secretary of the United States, ministers of the EU countries as well as NATO leadership take part in the project on regular basis. Project's goal is to counter propaganda and promote unbiased information and opinions on the post-Soviet space.

Kuroptev writes a blog on the Russian news web-site echo.msk.ru covering the conflict between Russia and Georgia as well as promoting pro-democratic development of the post-Soviet countries. Egor Kuroptev is famous for his activities targeted to counter Kremlin's negative influence in Georgia and other regional countries. He is one of the most well-known people, working on deoccupation of Georgia. In the interviews he underlines that Russian citizens must know more about the conflict, facts of 2008 August War and current situation in this regard.

Kuroptev is the author of various articles and reports. As political expert, he takes part in all major regional security and democracy-building conferences.

References

1986 births
Living people
Mass media people from Moscow
Russian bloggers
Russian journalists
Journalists from Georgia (country)